Trip may refer to:

Arts and entertainment

Fictional characters
 Trip (Pokémon), a Pokémon character
 Trip (Power Rangers), in the American television series Time Force Power Rangers
 Trip, in the 2013 film Metallica Through the Never
 Trip Fontaine, in the novel The Virgin Suicides
 Trip Tucker, in the television series Star Trek: Enterprise

Film and television

Films
 The Trip (1967 film), an American film directed by Roger Corman
 The Trip (2002 film), an American gay romance film
 A Trip, a 2011 Slovenian film
 Trip (film), a 2021 Indian Tamil-language film
 The Trip (2021 film), a Norwegian action-comedy film

Television

Series
 The Trip (1999 TV series), a British documentary series
 The Trip (2010 TV series), a British sitcom
 Trip, an upcoming comedy program on Quibi

Episodes
 "The Trip" (The Middle)
 "The Trip" (Seinfeld)
 "The Trip" (Six Feet Under)
 "The Trip" (This Is Us)

Music

Bands
 The Trip (Australian-Canadian band), a pop/rock band formed in 2007
 The Trip (British-Italian band), a 1970s progressive rock band

Albums
 Trip (Cause and Effect album), 1994
  Trip (Jhené Aiko album) or the title song, 2017
 Trip (Rina Aiuchi album) or the title song, 2008
 Trip (Rivermaya album), 1996
 Trip, by Cro, 2021
 Trip, by Lambchop, 2020
 Trip, by Mike Singer, or the title song, 2019
 T.R.I.P. (album), by the Lights Out, or the title song, 2017
 The Trip (Art Pepper album) or the title song, 1976
 The Trip (Djam Karet album) or the title song, 2013
 The Trip (Lætitia Sadier album), 2010
 The Trip: Created by Snow Patrol, compiled by Gary Lightbody, 2004
 Trips (Samiam album), 2011
 Trips, by Long Distance Calling, 2016

Songs
 "Trip" (Ella Mai song), 2018
 "Trip" (Hedley song), 2005
 "Trip", by Brockhampton from Saturation, 2017
 "Trip", by Hammerbox from Numb, 1993
 "Trip", by Kendrick Lamar from Kendrick Lamar, 2009
 "Trip (Siopao na Special)", by Parokya ni Edgar from Khangkhungkherrnitz, 1996
 "The Trip" (Kim Fowley song), 1965
 "The Trip", by Donovan from Sunshine Superman, 1966

Other media
 Trip (book), a 2018 nonfiction book by Tao Lin
 Trip (magazine), a Brazilian lifestyle magazine
 The Trip, a 1978 children's book by Ezra Jack Keats
 Captain Louie, originally The Trip, a stage musical by Stephen Schwartz, adapted from the Keats book

Acronyms
 Traveler Redress Inquiry Program, a U.S. Department of Homeland Security program
 TRIP steel ("transformation induced plasticity"), a kind of steel
 TRIPS Agreement (Agreement on Trade-Related Aspects of Intellectual Property Rights), an international trade agreement

Business
 Trip (drink), a Finnish brand of juice
 Trip.com, an online travel agency
 TRIP Linhas Aéreas, a former Brazilian airline
 TripAdvisor (NASDAQ symbol: TRIP)

People

Given name
 Trip Adler (born 1984), American entrepreneur
 Trip Gabriel (born 1955), American journalist
 Trip Hawkins (born 1953), American entrepreneur
 Trip Kuehne (born 1972), American golfer
 Trip Lee (born 1987), stage name of American rapper William Lee Barefield III
 Trip MacCracken (born 1974), American football manager
 Trip Payne (born 1968), American puzzle designer

Surname
 Boy Trip (1921–1990), Dutch politician
 Don Trip (born 1985), American rapper
 Rob Trip (born 1960), Dutch journalist and presenter

Other uses
 Butler Blue III, or "Trip", the 2013–2020 bulldog mascot of Butler University, Indianapolis, Indiana, US
 Trip (search engine), for searching evidence-based medical literature
 Trip, a village in Bixad, Satu Mare, Romania
 Trips formation, an American football formation
Tripping, the action of falling over
Trip, a psychedelic experience induced by drugs

See also 
 
 
 Tripe (disambiguation)
 Tripp (disambiguation)
 Trippe (disambiguation)
 Trippin' (disambiguation)
 Tripping (disambiguation)

Lists of people by nickname